Edward Joseph McCluskey (October 16, 1929 – February 13, 2016) was a professor at Stanford University. He was a pioneer in the field of Electrical Engineering.

Biography
McCluskey worked on electronic switching systems at the Bell Telephone Laboratories from 1955 to 1959. In 1959, he moved to Princeton University, where he was Professor of Electrical Engineering and Director of the University Computer Center. In 1966, he joined Stanford University, where he was Emeritus Professor of Electrical Engineering and Computer Science, as well as Director of the Center for Reliable Computing. He founded the Stanford Digital Systems Laboratory (now the Computer Systems Laboratory) in 1969 and the Stanford Computer Engineering Program (now the Computer Science MS Degree Program) in 1970. The Stanford Computer Forum (an Industrial Affiliates Program) was started by McCluskey and two colleagues in 1970 and he was its Director until 1978. Professor McCluskey led the Reliability and Testing Symposium (RATS).  McCluskey served as the first President of the IEEE Computer Society. He died on  February 13, 2016.

He was known for his disarming wit and occasional eccentric habits, like his hat collection.

Focus of research
McCluskey developed the first algorithm for designing combinational circuits – the Quine–McCluskey logic minimization procedure – as a doctoral student at MIT.  His 1956 thesis, supervised by Samuel H. Caldwell, was entitled Algebraic Minimization and the Design of Two-Terminal Contact Networks. At Bell Labs and Princeton, he developed the modern theory of transients (hazards) in logic networks and formulated the concept of operating modes of sequential circuits. He collaborated with Signetics researchers in developing one of the first practical multivalued logic implementations and then worked out a design technique for such circuitry.

His Stanford research focuses on logic testing, synthesis, design for testability, and fault-tolerant computing. Professor McCluskey and his students at the Center for Reliable Computing worked out many key ideas for fault equivalence, probabilistic modeling of logic networks, pseudo-exhaustive testing, and watchdog processors.

Academic descendants
He proudly claimed his students as his main product. He had mentored over 70 PhD students and has an expanding family of academic 'grandchildren'. His direct students include Jacob A. Abraham, Daniel Siewiorek, Nur Touba, Subhasish Mitra, Mehdi Tahoori, Jacob Savir, and Ken Wagner; his academic 'grandchildren' include Prithviraj Banerjee, Wesley Kent Fuchs, and Mario Barbacci.

Awards and honors
McCluskey is the recipient of the 1996 IEEE Emanuel R. Piore Award "for pioneering and fundamental contributions to design automation and fault tolerant computing."

He is also the recipient of the 2012 IEEE John von Neumann Medal, "for fundamental contributions that shaped the design and testing of digital systems."

McCluskey received the 2008 Computer Pioneer Award from the IEEE Computer Society "for seminal contributions to the design and synthesis of digital systems over five decades, including the first algorithm for logic synthesis (the Quine–McCluskey method);" he also earned the 1991 Taylor Booth Award for "outstanding service as a computer science & engineering educator and for inspiring students and educators alike through his prolific contribution as a teacher, author, curriculum developer & graduate research supervisor."

The IEEE Computer Society named its Technical Achievement Award in honor of McCluskey: The Edward J. McCluskey Technical Achievement Award. 

He was a Fellow of the Institute of Electrical and Electronics Engineers (IEEE), the American Association for the Advancement of Science (AAAS), and the Association for Computing Machinery (ACM); and an elected member of the National Academy of Engineering (NAE) (1998).

He received honorary doctorates from the University of Grenoble and Bowdoin College.

He was honored at a special session of 2008 ACM/SIGDA San Jose, California on November 10–13, 2008, where tributes were shared by distinguished researchers Robert K. Brayton, Bernard Courtois, Giovanni De Micheli, Ravishankar K. Iyer, Daniel P. Siewiorek, Tom Williams and Yervant Zorian.

References

Further reading
McCluskey's page at Stanford.
Curriculum vitae
Biography of McCluskey

Fellows of the American Association for the Advancement of Science
Fellows of the Association for Computing Machinery
Fellow Members of the IEEE
Members of the United States National Academy of Engineering
2016 deaths
1929 births